Fairfield Township is a civil township of Lenawee County in the U.S. state of Michigan. As of the 2000 census, the township population was 1,756.

Communities 
It was first known as Baker's Corners after the brothers Moses, Orin, and Joseph Baker bought land here in 1831–32. A post office named Baker's opened January 29, 1835, with Orrin Baker as the first postmaster. It was renamed to Fairfield after the township on April 13, 1842. The post office was discontinued July 15, 1921.
The first European settler was Andrew Millet, arriving in 1824. A post office was opened June 18, 1874, with Henry Ferguson as the first postmaster. The ZIP code for the Jasper post office is 49248. The Lake Shore and Michigan Southern Railway had a depot in Jasper. The station was at first known as Fairfield.
A post office opened December 9, 1898, and operated until November 29, 1902.
Ezra Cole was the first European settler of Weston in 1835. Initially known as Oakford, a post office opened with that name on July 27, 1854, with Northright Knapp as the first postmaster. On June 15, 1869, the post office was renamed Weston after professional pedestrian Edward Payson Weston. The ZIP code for the Weston post office is 49289. The Lake Shore and Michigan Southern Railway had a depot in Weston.

Geography 
According to the United States Census Bureau, the township has a total area of 42.0 square miles (108.7 km2), all land.

Demographics 
As of the census of 2000, there were 1,756 people, 621 households, and 481 families residing in the township. There were 666 housing units at an average density of 15.9 per square mile (6.1/km2). The racial makeup of the township was 97.49% White, 0.11% African American, 0.57% Native American, 0.06% Asian, 0.63% from other races, and 1.14% from two or more races. Hispanic or Latino of any race were 3.87% of the population.

There were 621 households, out of which 38.0% had children under the age of 18 living with them, 67.8% were married couples living together, 6.4% had a female householder with no husband present, and 22.4% were non-families. 19.5% of all households were made up of individuals, and 9.2% had someone living alone who was 65 years of age or older.  The average household size was 2.81 and the average family size was 3.22.

In the township the population was spread out, with 29.4% under the age of 18, 7.7% from 18 to 24, 27.6% from 25 to 44, 24.3% from 45 to 64, and 11.0% who were 65 years of age or older.  The median age was 37 years. For every 100 females, there were 99.8 males.  For every 100 females age 18 and over, there were 95.1 males.

The median income for a household in the township was $42,900, and the median income for a family was $47,330. Males had a median income of $35,690 versus $24,259 for females. The per capita income for the township was $17,496.  About 2.7% of families and 4.8% of the population were below the poverty line, including 6.0% of those under age 18 and 4.2% of those age 65 or over.

References

External links 
Lenawee County government site

Townships in Lenawee County, Michigan
Townships in Michigan